The 2017 African Junior Athletics Championships was the thirteenth edition of the biennial, continental athletics tournament for African athletes aged 19 years or younger. It was held at the Stade Lalla Setti in Tlemcen, Algeria, between 29 June and 2 July.

Medal summary

Men

Women

Medal table

Key

References

Official site (archived)
Results
Official results (archived)
Results

African Junior Athletics Championships
International athletics competitions hosted by Algeria
African Junior Athletics Championships
African Junior Athletics Championships
Junior Athletics Championships
African Junior Athletics Championships